Volodymyr Fink (born March 28, 1958 in Slavgorod, Altai Krai, Russian SFSR; died January 13, 2005 in Bila Tserkva in a car crash) was a Soviet Ukrainian professional football player.

Fink was of a German descent.

References

External links
 Career summary by KLISF

1958 births
2005 deaths
Ukrainian people of German descent
Russian footballers
Soviet footballers
Soviet Top League players
FC Dynamo Barnaul players
FC Chornomorets Odesa players
FC Zimbru Chișinău players
Road incident deaths in Ukraine
Association football forwards
People from Slavgorod
Sportspeople from Altai Krai